Robert John Gourley (February 20, 1878 – March 11, 1976) was a Canadian curler. He was the skip of the 1931 Brier Champion team, representing Manitoba.

References

Brier champions
1878 births
1976 deaths
People from the Regional Municipality of Peel
Curlers from Winnipeg
Canadian male curlers
Canadian expatriates in the United States